Inconscientes are a Spanish hard rock band founded by Iñaki "Uoho" Antón, former guitarist of Platero y Tú and current guitarist of Extremoduro. Their music style resembles the aforementioned bands, mainly influenced by classic rock bands such as Deep Purple or Status Quo.

History
At late 2006, Extremoduro's frontman Roberto Iniesta declared that he was uninspired and the band wouldn't tour or released new albums. However, Iñaki Antón decided to form a new band parallel to Extremoduro. Antón who had recently created his own label Muxik to release albums of new rock bands, he joined to his bandmates Miguel Colino and José Ignacio Cantera and a new rock vocalist, bandmember of Memoria de Pez, Jon Calvo. At first, the band would be named as La Inconsciencia de Uoho but later was changed to Inconscientes. The album was recorded at Antón's home studio located in Vizcaya and was mastered by Tony Cousins in London (Metropoli Mastering). The recording lasted from December 10, 2006 to January 21, 2007. Finally their first studio album La Inconsciencia de Uoho was released on February 27, 2007 under Muxik label. The tour began on March 16 at the Sagarrondotik Festival in Hernani. During their tour, there were collaborations of Juantxu Olano (ex-Platero y Tú, current La Gripe), poet Manolo Chinato and José Alberto Batiz (ex-Fito & Fitipaldis). They covered songs of Platero y Tú, Extremoduro and Extrechinato y Tú, in addition to playing their own songs.

Members
 Iñaki "Uoho" Antón – Guitar
 Jon Calvo – Vocals and Guitar
 Miguel Colino – Bass
 José Ignacio Cantera – Drums

Discography

Album

References 

Spanish hard rock musical groups